Wateringen is a town in the Dutch province of South Holland. It is a part of the municipality of Westland, and lies about 5 km southwest of The Hague.

Until 2004 it was a separate municipality and covered an area of 8.93 km².

The former municipality of Wateringen also included the town Kwintsheul.

The village of Wateringen has a population of around 10,860.
The statistical area Wateringen, which also can include the surrounding countryside, has a population of around 13,880.

Gallery

References

External links
 Municipality of Westland (in Dutch)

Municipalities of the Netherlands disestablished in 2004
Populated places in South Holland
Former municipalities of South Holland
Westland (municipality), Netherlands